The 2019 Copa Sudamericana final stages were played from 9 July to 9 November 2019. A total of 16 teams competed in the final stages to decide the champions of the 2019 Copa Sudamericana, with the final played in Asunción, Paraguay at the Estadio General Pablo Rojas.

Qualified teams
The 16 winners of the second stage advanced to the round of 16.

Seeding

Starting from the round of 16, the teams were seeded according to the second stage draw, with each team assigned a "seed" 1–16 corresponding to the tie they won (O1–O16) (Regulations Article 22.c).

Format

Starting from the round of 16, the teams played a single-elimination tournament with the following rules:
In the round of 16, quarter-finals, and semi-finals, each tie was played on a home-and-away two-legged basis, with the higher-seeded team hosting the second leg (Regulations Article 22.d). If tied on aggregate, the away goals rule was used. If still tied, extra time was not played, and a penalty shoot-out was used to determine the winner (Regulations Article 27).
The final was played as a single match at a venue pre-selected by CONMEBOL, with the higher-seeded team designated as the "home" team for administrative purposes (Regulations Article 25). If tied after regulation, 30 minutes of extra time were played. If still tied after extra time, a penalty shoot-out was used to determine the winner (Regulations Article 28).

Bracket
The bracket starting from the round of 16 was determined as follows:

The bracket was decided based on the second stage draw, which was held on 13 May 2019.

Round of 16
The first legs were played on 9–11 and 23–25 July, and the second legs were played on 16–18, 30–31 July and 1 August 2019.

|}

Match A

La Equidad won 4–2 on aggregate and advanced to the quarter-finals (Match S1).

Match B

Independiente del Valle won 2–0 on aggregate and advanced to the quarter-finals (Match S2).

Match C

Fluminense won 5–2 on aggregate and advanced to the quarter-finals (Match S3).

Match D

Tied 3–3 on aggregate, Zulia won on away goals and advanced to the quarter-finals (Match S4).

Match E

Tied 1–1 on aggregate, Colón won on penalties and advanced to the quarter-finals (Match S4).

Match F

Corinthians won 4–1 on aggregate and advanced to the quarter-finals (Match S3).

Match G

Tied 3–3 on aggregate, Independiente won on away goals and advanced to the quarter-finals (Match S2).

Match H

Atlético Mineiro won 3–0 on aggregate and advanced to the quarter-finals (Match S1).

Quarter-finals
The first legs were played on 6, 8, 20 and 22 August, and the second legs were played on 13, 15, 27 and 29 August 2019.

|}

Match S1

Atlético Mineiro won 5–2 on aggregate and advanced to the semi-finals (Match F1).

Match S2

Tied 2–2 on aggregate, Independiente del Valle won on away goals and advanced to the semi-finals (Match F2).

Match S3

Tied 1–1 on aggregate, Corinthians won on away goals and advanced to the semi-finals (Match F2).

Match S4

Colón won 4–1 on aggregate and advanced to the semi-finals (Match F1).

Semi-finals
The first legs were played on 18–19 September, and the second legs were played on 25–26 September 2019.

|}

Match F1

Tied 3–3 on aggregate, Colón won on away goals and advanced to the final.

Match F2

Independiente del Valle won 4–2 on aggregate and advanced to the final.

Final

The final was played on 9 November 2019 at the Estadio General Pablo Rojas in Asunción.

Notes

References

External links
CONMEBOL Sudamericana 2019, CONMEBOL.com

3
July 2019 sports events in South America
August 2019 sports events in South America
September 2019 sports events in South America
November 2019 sports events in South America